Henzler is a German surname. Notable people with the surname include:

Simon Henzler (born 1976), German footballer and coach
Wolf Henzler (born 1975), German racing driver

See also
Hendler
Hengler

German-language surnames